Alessandro Budel (born 25 February 1981) is an Italian former professional footballer who played as a midfielder.

Club career

Milan
Born in Basiglio, in the Province of Milan, Budel started his career at A.C. Milan. However, he never played for the team in Serie A. He spent two seasons on loan at Serie C1 club Spezia from 2000 to 2002. In June 2002, Budel, Ferri, and Baù were signed by Serie B club Triestina in co-ownership deals for a total fee of 1 billion lire (about €516,457).

Triestina
Budel spent a season with Serie B club Triestina from June 2002 to June 2003. On 11 June 2003 Milan bought back Budel.

Return to Milan
In June 2003 Milan bought back Budel for €2 million fee, with Ferri moved to Trieste outright for a fee of another €2 million, making the deal an effective cashless swap. However, Budel spent two seasons on loan to 3 Serie A and 1 Serie B clubs. On 1 July 2005, Cagliari signed him outright, after the expiry of a loan at the Sardinian club.

Cagliari
Budel was signed by Cagliari on 31 January 2005, initially in a season-long loan deal. On 1 July 2005, the club signed him outright for a reported three-year contract. After a bar fight between Davide Marchini and allegedly Pasquale Foggia, Budel was sided with Marchini. However, both Budel and Marchini were suspended by the club, according to his personal statement on TV in March 2008. Budel was fined €1,000 for his statement as well as public opinion he gave on Cagliari chairman Massimo Cellino, by the Italian Football Federation in September 2008.

Budel was released by Cagliari in January 2008.

Empoli
Budel was signed by Empoli F.C. in January 2008. He only spent 6 months with the club.

Return to Parma
Budel was signed by Parma as a free agent in 2008.

Brescia
In January 2010, Budel (50% rights tagged for €2.5 million) and Nicolás Córdova (50% rights tagged for €1 million) were part of a cashless player swap with Brescia for Andrea Rispoli (50% rights tagged for €3.5 million). Both Parma and Brescia made a capital gain of about €7 million for 2009–10 financial year, but in term of the value of the registration rights of their new signings. The two clubs retained the 50% registration rights of the three players. Budel signed a -year contract.

In June 2011, Parma and Brescia acquired the remaining rights for free. He also signed a new contract in 2011, but with wage reduction.

On 9 September 2014, Budel signed a new contract with Brescia again. However, he sustained a season-long injury in October 2014.

Pro Vercelli
On 1 February 2016, Budel joined Pro Vercelli on a free transfer.

International career
Budel and fellow Milan youth products Baù and Antonini were included in Italy under-21 Serie B representative team in 2003. They won 2–1 against Belgium U21 team.

References

External links
 La Gazzetta dello Sport player profile (2005–06) 
 La Gazzetta dello Sport player profile (2006–07) 
 AIC profile (data by football.it) 
 

Italian footballers
A.C. Milan players
Spezia Calcio players
U.S. Triestina Calcio 1918 players
U.S. Lecce players
Genoa C.F.C. players
Parma Calcio 1913 players
Cagliari Calcio players
Empoli F.C. players
Brescia Calcio players
F.C. Pro Vercelli 1892 players
Serie A players
Serie B players
Serie C players
Association football midfielders
Sportspeople from the Metropolitan City of Milan
Footballers from Lombardy
1981 births
Living people